The Shepherd Rams are the athletic teams that represent Shepherd University (formerly Shepherd College), located in Shepherdstown, West Virginia, in Division II intercollegiate sports of the National Collegiate Athletic Association (NCAA). The Rams compete as members of the Pennsylvania State Athletic Conference (PSAC) for all 15 varsity sports since the 2019–20 academic year. They were previously competed in the Mountain East Conference (MEC) from 2013–14 to 2018–19, and before that, the now-defunct West Virginia Intercollegiate Athletic Conference (WVIAC) from 1924–25 to 2012–13.

Varsity teams

List of teams
 
 
Men's sports 
 Baseball
 Basketball
 Cross country
 Football
 Golf
 Soccer
 Tennis

 
Women's sports 
 Basketball
 Cross country
 Golf
 Lacrosse
 Soccer
 Softball
 Tennis
 Volleyball

Individual teams

Baseball
The current head coach is Matt McCarty, a 2010 graduate of Shepherd. McCarty was named as the interim head baseball coach in September 2012 and was elevated to head baseball coach in July 2013.  He won the MEC and Atlantic Region Baseball Coach of the Year in 2014.

The Ram baseball team has won the  WVIAC/MEC championship in 1983, 1984, 2004, 2009, 2012, 2016. and 2017.

Football
The current head coach is Ernie McCook, a 1992 graduate of Wesley College. McCook was elevated to head coach after the retirement of longtime coach Monte Cater. McCook previously served as offensive line coach at Shepherd from 1999-2008 and was also the offensive coordinator starting in 2000. McCook was elevated to assistant head coach in 2007. He spent the 2009 season as running game coordinator/tight ends coach at Liberty University, before returning to Shepherd the next season, where he served as assistant head coach/offensive coordinator for the next seven years.

After the 2021 football season, Junior QB Tyson Bagent won the Harlon Hill Trophy for most outstanding Division II player, the first Shepherd player to win the award.

The NAIA Years (pre-1994)

Postseason First Steps
In 1983, Shepherd reached the post-season for the first time in school history, losing to Carson-Newman 42–21 in the first round of the NAIA playoffs.

The Rams again advanced to the playoffs in 1986 and again they lost to Carson-Newman 30–10 in the first round.

In 1991, they advanced and this time they lost to Central State 34–22 in the first round.

Finally in 1992, the Rams earned their first ever post-season win by beating Carson-Newman 6–3.  In the next round, however, they lost to Gardner–Webb 22–7.

The NCAA DII Years (1994–present)

Postseason success

Note: The NCAA expanded the playoff field from 16 to 24 teams in 2000 and from 24 to 28 teams in 2015.

Volleyball
The current head coach is Alex Hoekstra, a 2010 graduate of University of Mount Olive.

Rams on the next level

Baseball
Shepherd has had four baseball players drafted by MLB:

 1B Nathan Minnich, the 2012 Tino Martinez Award winner, was taken in the 8th round of the 2012 MLB draft by the Boston Red Sox.  He played for 2 seasons, alternating between the GCL Red Sox of the Gulf Coast League and the Lowell Spinners of the New York–Penn League. Minnich was released by the Red Sox on March 31, 2014.
 RHP Josh McCauley was taken in the 21st round of the 2013 MLB draft by the Chicago Cubs.  He did not sign with the Cubs, however.
 OF Jared Carr was taken in the 13th round of the 2021 MLB draft by the Philadelphia Phillies.
 OF Brenton Doyle was taken in the 4th round of the 2019 MLB draft by the Colorado Rockies.
Other notable Shepherd baseball players:

 LHP Charles "Lefty" Willis played for 21 teams from 1923–1938.
 RHP Frank Funk played for 24 teams from 1954–1969 and managed 9 teams from 1969–1991
 RHP Cecil Perkins played for 12 teams from 1962–1968.
 RHP Brian Sands played for the Elmira Pioneers of the Northeast League for 1 season.
 OF Michael Spry played for the River City Rascals, Chillicothe Paints, and Evansville Otters, all of the Frontier League, from 2003–2007.
 3B Nash Hutter played for the Rockford Aviators of the Frontier League for 1 season.
 RHP Charlie Gordon played for the Normal CornBelters of the Frontier League and the Sussex Skyhawks of the Canadian American Association of Professional Baseball.
 LHP Paul Hvozdovic, holder of Shepherd career marks for most wins (34), innings pitched (340), most strikeouts (307), most games started (56), most complete games (19), played for the River City Rascals of the Frontier League.

Football
Shepherd has had 3 football players drafted by the NFL:

 QB John Shearer was taken with the 6th pick in the 28th round of the 1956 NFL Draft by the Baltimore Colts, and T Bob Hogue was taken with the 11th pick in the 20th round of the 1960 NFL Draft, also by the Colts. Neither played in the NFL.
 RB Wayne Wilson was taken with the 21st pick in the 12th round of the 1979 NFL Draft by the Houston Oilers. He played for 3 NFL teams from 1979–1987 and is currently the WR coach at Shepherd.

Other notable Shepherd football players:
 FS Brian Baumgardner signed with the Charleston Swamp Foxes of the now defunct AF2 in April 2000. 
 DB/KR James Rooths played for the New York Jets, Green Bay Packers, Minnesota Vikings, and Tampa Bay Buccaneers.  He also played for NFL Europe's Scottish Claymores for 2 seasons. After his playing career, Rooths was an assistant defensive backs coach with the Frankfurt Galaxy. He was an assistant football coach for Wilde Lake High School in 2010 and was part of the Baltimore Ravens strength and conditioning staff in 2013.
 K/P Ricky Schmitt has played for 6 NFL teams and 2 CFL teams.
 TE Dominique Jones has played in the United Football League, the Indoor Football League, and for 8 NFL teams.  
 QB Joel Gordon played with Arena Football League 2's Richmond Speed and the Winterthur Warriors of the Swiss Nationalliga A. Gordon led the Warriors the Swiss Bowl in 2006. Gordon was the QB coach at Shepherd in 2003, 2005–07, and 2011–2015. In 2016 Gordon became the OC at Ferrum College.
 DE Ramal Faunteroy played for AFL2's Manchester Wolves.  Faunteroy is currently the defensive line coach at Shepherd.  On June 12, 2014, Faunteroy was selected to participate in the Bill Walsh NFL Minority Coaching Fellowship. 
 DL/LB Robert Hayes signed with the Portland Thunder of the Arena Football League in December 2014. He also played for the Baltimore Brigade.
 LB Louis Corum played for the United Football League's Virginia Destroyers and the Indoor Football League's now defunct Richmond Revolution.
 DE Howard Jones was signed by the Pittsburgh Steelers after the 2014 NFL Draft.  He also played for the Tampa Bay Buccaneers and the Chicago Bears.  He is currently a free agent.
 DE Shaneil Jenkins was signed by the Denver Broncos following the 2016 NFL Draft.  He currently plays for the Ottawa RedBlacks of the Canadian Football League.
 WR Billy Brown was signed by the Philadelphia Eagles on May 1, 2017.  
 S Tre Sullivan was signed by the Philadelphia Eagles on May 1, 2017 and played for 2 years.
 QB Jeff Ziemba was signed by the CAN-AM Indoor Football League's Baltimore Lightning in late 2017.  He played 3 years for the Indoor Football League's Arizona Rattlers where he was named IFL Offensive Player Of The Week for Week 5 in 2018. He was also named the IFL's Offensive Rookie Of The Year for 2018.
 LB Elijah Norris signed with the Chicago Bears on April 28, 2018.  He was waived on September 1.
 QB Connor Jessop signed with the Washington Football Team on August 26, 2018.  He was waived on September 1. He is currently a free agent.
 CB DeJuan Neal was selected by the New York Guardians of the revived XFL in Phase 5 of the 2020 XFL Draft.  2 years  later, he was drafted 90th overall by the New Jersey Generals in the 2022 USFL Draft. On July 14, 2022, he was signed by the Washington Commanders. and was released on August 30 during final roster cuts.  He was drafted by the DC Defenders of the XFL on November 16, 2022.
 WR Devin Phelps signed with the Arizona Cardinals on April 26, 2020. He was released on July 27.
 WR Deonte Glover was drafted by the Edmonton Elks in the 3rd round of the 2021 CFL draft.
 OG Joey Fisher was taken in the 3rd round of the 2023 USFL Draft by the Houston Gamblers.

References

External links